Kalamon or Kalamonas ( or ), until the 1920s known as Bosinos (Μποσινός) is a village in Kalampaki municipality, Drama regional unit, Greece. At the 2011 census, the population of the village was 597.

References

Populated places in Drama (regional unit)